Chin-Lung Hu (born February 2, 1984, Chinese 胡金龍 Hú Jīnlóng) is a Taiwanese professional baseball shortstop for the Fubon Guardians of the Chinese Professional Baseball League (CPBL). He previously played in Major League Baseball (MLB) for the Los Angeles Dodgers and New York Mets. He was the fifth player — and first infielder — from Taiwan to play in MLB. His last name (along with that of fellow Taiwanese Fu-Te Ni, formerly of the Detroit Tigers) is the shortest in MLB history.

Professional career

Los Angeles Dodgers
Hu was signed by the Dodgers on January 31, 2003, and began his professional career with the rookie league Ogden Raptors in 2003. He split  between the Columbus Catfish in A ball and the Vero Beach Dodgers in High-A ball. In , he played the whole season at Vero Beach and hit .313 with 23 stolen bases.

In , he played for the Double-A Jacksonville Suns. He won the MVP award for his performance in the 2007 game.

He was promoted to Triple-A Las Vegas on July 12, 2007, and made his major league debut on September 1, against the San Diego Padres. In his second MLB at bat, Hu hit a solo home run against the San Diego Padres reliever Brett Tomko on September 11, 2007, against the Padres, becoming the first position player born in Taiwan to hit a home run in MLB. (Hu's teammate, pitcher Hong-Chih Kuo, had become the first Taiwanese-born player to hit a home run in MLB earlier in 2007). On September 25, Hu hit a two-run homer against the Colorado Rockies' starting pitcher Ubaldo Jiménez and became the first Taiwanese-born player to hit two home runs. Hu spent most of 2009 in AAA with the Albuquerque Isotopes and appeared in only five games with the Dodgers after a September callup.

In 2010, he again spent most of the year with the Isotopes. He appeared in 14 games with the Dodgers in 2010 and got 3 hits in 23 at-bats.

New York Mets

On December 27, 2010, he was traded to the New York Mets in exchange for pitcher Michael Antonini. On May 17, he was outrighted to the minor leagues.

Cleveland Indians

After playing for the Adelaide Bite of the Australian Baseball League and starting shortstop for the World All-Stars at the 2011 Australian Baseball League All-Star Game, Hu signed a minor league contract with the Cleveland Indians in January, 2012. He was released on March 28, 2012 and signed to a minor league deal with the Philadelphia Phillies, however his contract was voided the next day after he failed a physical. He then signed with the Southern Maryland Blue Crabs for the 2012 season.

EDA Rhinos/Fubon Guardians

In 2013, he signed with the EDA Rhinos of the Chinese Professional Baseball League. Hu was named captain of the team.  On September 11, 2016, Hu hit two home runs as part of a CPBL record eight home runs hit by the Rhinos. Hu and the Rhinos won the 2016 Taiwan Series, before the team changed its name to the Fubon Guardians the next season.

While playing in the CPBL, Hu participated in the 2019 WBSC Premier12.
On April 18, 2020, Hu became the 23rd and fastest player in CPBL history to reach 1,000 hits. He was demoted to the CPBL minor leagues on June 25, 2020, as a message posted on the messaging application Line suggested that Hu advocated for the firing of field manager .

International career

Hu was selected for Chinese Taipei national baseball team at the 2006 World Baseball Classic, 2006 Asian Games, 2010 Asian Games and 2017 World Baseball Classic.

He missed the 2009 World Baseball Classic and 2013 World Baseball Classic editions of the event due to injury.

See also
 List of Major League Baseball players from Taiwan

References

External links

1984 births
Living people
2006 World Baseball Classic players
2017 World Baseball Classic players
Adelaide Bite players
Albuquerque Isotopes players
Asian Games gold medalists for Chinese Taipei
Asian Games medalists in baseball
Asian Games silver medalists for Chinese Taipei
Baseball outfielders
Baseball players at the 2006 Asian Games
Baseball players at the 2010 Asian Games
Buffalo Bisons (minor league) players
Columbus Catfish players
EDA Rhinos players
Fubon Guardians players
Gulf Coast Mets players
Jacksonville Suns players
Las Vegas 51s players
Los Angeles Dodgers players
New York Mets players
Major League Baseball players from Taiwan
Major League Baseball second basemen
Major League Baseball shortstops
Medalists at the 2006 Asian Games
Medalists at the 2010 Asian Games
Ogden Raptors players
Baseball players from Tainan
Southern Maryland Blue Crabs players
Taiwanese expatriate baseball players in the United States
Vero Beach Dodgers players
Tomateros de Culiacán players
Taiwanese expatriate baseball players in Mexico